Stefanos Katsikas (born 28 February 2002) is a Greek professional footballer who plays as a right-back for Super League 2 club AEK Athens B.

References

2002 births
Living people
Super League Greece 2 players
AEK Athens F.C. players
Association football defenders
Footballers from Athens
Greek footballers
AEK Athens F.C. B players